Lawrence Grey may refer to:

Lawrence Grey, from list of characters in The Passage a series of novels by author Justin Cronin
Lawrence Grey (judge), of Ohio Supreme Court elections
Lawrence Grey (magician) (1894–1951), magician
Lawrence Grey (producer), Canadian-American film and television producer

See also
Lawrence Gray (disambiguation)